Amanda Sue Locke (born August 31, 1989) is an American, former collegiate All-American softball player and current coach at Birmingham–Southern College.

Playing career
She attended North Mesquite High School, graduating in 2008. She later attended the University of Alabama, where she played first base and pitcher on the Alabama Crimson Tide softball team. Following her freshman year, she was named SEC Freshman of the Year. During her senior season in 2012, Locke was named a second team All-American, as she led the Crimson Tide to the 2012 Women's College World Series final, where they defeated Oklahoma 2–1 in the champ series, to claim Alabama's and the Southeastern Conference's first NCAA softball title.

Coaching career
After graduating from Alabama, Locke served as an assistant softball coach at Northwestern State from 2013 to 2014, and an assistant softball coach at Texas Tech University from 2015 to 2018. On August 27, 2018, Locke returned to Northwestern State and was once again named an assistant softball coach for the Lady Demons. 

On July 28, 2021, Locke was named head softball coach at Birmingham–Southern College.

Statistics

Alabama Crimson Tide

Head coaching record

References

External links
 
 Northwestern State Lady Demons bio
 Texas Tech Red Raiders bio
 Alabama Crimson Tide bio

1989 births
Living people
Softball players from Texas
American softball coaches
Northwestern State Demons and Lady Demons coaches
Texas Tech Red Raiders softball coaches
Alabama Crimson Tide softball players
Birmingham–Southern Panthers softball coaches
People from Mesquite, Texas